McIntosh (Lakota: Maktáža) is a city in and the county seat of Corson County, South Dakota, United States. The population was 173 at the 2010 census and 111 at the 2020 United States Census.

History
McIntosh was named for a sibling duo who worked for the railroad. The town was established in 1909.

McIntosh was the site of a Cold War era radar station. On April 1, 2006, the wood frame courthouse burned to the ground. Twenty-five year old Dwight Crigger, an employee of the local weed and pest board, was arrested for the setting the fire. It was the last wood courthouse in use in South Dakota.

Geography
McIntosh is located at  (45.921649, -101.350171). McIntosh has been assigned the ZIP code 57641 and the FIPS place code 39940.

McIntosh is located on US Route 12 and a mile west of the junction with South Dakota Highway 65. It is also a mile west of East (McIntosh) Lake, a lake created by the railroad bed.

Climate
McIntosh holds the record for the coldest record temperature in South Dakota, set February 17, 1936.

That same year, McIntosh set its own record for highest temperature that stands to this day.

Demographics

2010 census
As of the census of 2010, there were 173 people. The city had 84 households, and 49 families residing in the city. Between 2000 and 2010, the city's population declined by 20%.

Racially, the city is 76.301% White people, 19.075% Native Americans, 2.312% Hispanic or Latino descent, 0.578% Asian, and 1.734% from other races.

There were 84 households, of which 21 households had children under the age of 18 living with them, 34 households were married couples living together, 5 households had a female householder with no husband present, 5 households had a male householder with no wife present, and 35 households were non-families. 34 households were made up of individuals. 20 households had someone living alone who was 65 years of age or older. The average household size was 2.06 and the average family size was 2.65.

The median age in the city was 50.8 years. 39 residents were under the age of 18. 5 residents were between the ages of 18 and 24. 32 residents were from between the ages of 25 to 44. 49 residents were between the ages of 45 to 64. 48 residents were 65 years of age or older. The gender makeup of the city was 49.7% male and 50.3% female.

See also
 List of cities in South Dakota

References

External links

 Corson County
 McIntosh School District

Cities in South Dakota
Cities in Corson County, South Dakota
County seats in South Dakota